Templeton is a small town on the outskirts of Christchurch. Lying along State Highway 1. Templeton has been the centre of harness racing in Canterbury.

Its European history goes to over 140 years when it was a watering point for horses between Christchurch and the Selwyn River / Waikirikiri.

Templeton Hospital has had a major impact on the area, providing employment and controversy over many years.

More recently Ruapuna Park has created public debate regarding acceptable noise levels for residents near motor-sports venues.

Paparua to the north of Templeton has Christchurch's men's and women's prisons.

Demographics

Templeton had a population of 1,797 at the 2018 New Zealand census, an increase of 9 people (0.5%) since the 2013 census, and an increase of 228 people (14.5%) since the 2006 census. There were 687 households. There were 864 males and 933 females, giving a sex ratio of 0.93 males per female. The median age was 40.5 years (compared with 37.4 years nationally), with 324 people (18.0%) aged under 15 years, 321 (17.9%) aged 15 to 29, 903 (50.3%) aged 30 to 64, and 249 (13.9%) aged 65 or older.

Ethnicities were 88.6% European/Pākehā, 13.5% Māori, 2.2% Pacific peoples, 5.5% Asian, and 2.2% other ethnicities (totals add to more than 100% since people could identify with multiple ethnicities).

The proportion of people born overseas was 15.4%, compared with 27.1% nationally.

Although some people objected to giving their religion, 54.4% had no religion, 35.1% were Christian, 1.0% were Hindu, 0.5% were Muslim, 0.5% were Buddhist and 2.3% had other religions.

Of those at least 15 years old, 174 (11.8%) people had a bachelor or higher degree, and 363 (24.6%) people had no formal qualifications. The median income was $38,200, compared with $31,800 nationally. The employment status of those at least 15 was that 828 (56.2%) people were employed full-time, 213 (14.5%) were part-time, and 45 (3.1%) were unemployed.

Education
Templeton School is a full primary school catering for years 1 to 8.

Notable residents
Roger Drayton (1925–1986), born in Templeton; Labour MP (1969–1978)
David Jones (1874–1941), born in Templeton; Minister of Agriculture (1931–1932)

References

Suburbs of Christchurch
Populated places in Canterbury, New Zealand